The district courts in Sri Lanka are lower courts headed by a District Judge who is vested with original civil jurisdiction. In metropolitan areas such as Colombo there are multiple district courts in one location.

Jurisdiction 
Originally district judges were appointed to major cities and towns to hear civil cases, current district courts are established under the Judicature Act, No. 2 of 1978 to each judicial division in Sri Lanka. The Minister in charge of the subject of Justice in consultation with the Chief Justice and the President of the Court of Appeal would define the territorial limits of each judicial division. At present there are 54 judicial districts in Sri Lanka.

It has unlimited original jurisdiction of;
 Civil and commercial disputes  
 Income and insolvency testamentary cases
 Family and marital disputes, including divorce and nullity of marriage
 Guardianship of persons of unsound mind and their property
 Testamentary cases of person deceased
 Care of minors and their property

Jurisdiction of commercial disputes higher than Rs. 3 million in value and arising in the Western Province, is exercised by the High Court of Colombo. Appeals from judgments, decrees and orders of a district court lie to the Court of Appeal.

Appointment and removal of District Judges
All district judges are appointed by the Judicial Service Commission, which has power of dismissal and disciplinary control of the district judges. Additional district judges would be appointed to a district court.

See also
 Supreme Court of Sri Lanka
 Constitution of Sri Lanka

References

Courts of Sri Lanka